The following is a list of football stadiums in Morocco, ordered by capacity.

Currently in use

Under construction

Future stadiums

Former stadiums

See also
List of African stadiums by capacity
List of stadiums by capacity

References

External links
Morocco at WorldStadiums.com
Photos of Stadiums in Morocco at cafe.daum.net/stade

 
Morocco
Football stadiums